Colgate may refer to:

Places 
Colgate, North Dakota, US
Colgate, Wisconsin, US
Colgate, West Sussex, England, UK
Colgate, Saskatchewan, Canada

Other 
Colgate (name)
Colgate (toothpaste), a product of Colgate-Palmolive
Colgate-Palmolive, a corporation
The Colgate Comedy Hour, an American musical variety television show sponsored by Colgate-Palmolive
Colgate Clock (Indiana), an octagonal clock in Clarksville, Indiana
Colgate Clock (Jersey City), an octagonal clock in Jersey City, New Jersey
Colgate University, a private liberal arts college in Madison County, New York
Colgate (pony), a character in My Little Pony

See also
Coalgate (disambiguation)
Colgate Clock (disambiguation)
Colegate